Gambool located at 31°05′15″S 143°13′25″E in Central Darling Shire is a remote rural locality and civil parish of Yungnulgra County in far North West New South Wales.

Geography
The Parish has an arid landscape. The nearest town is Whitecliffs 2 km to the north.

Climate
The parish has extremely hot summers and mild winters. The parish has a Köppen climate classification of BWh (Hot desert),. is almost unpopulated, with less than two inhabitants per square kilometer.

History
The Parish is on the traditional lands of the Wandjiwalgu. 
Aboriginal peoples.

In 1838 Thomas Mitchell (explorer) travelled down the nearby Darling River. 
Charles Sturt passed through the Wandjiwalgu lands during 1845, and in 1861 the Burke and Wills expedition passed nearby.

Opal was discovered in the area in the late 19th century.

References

Localities in New South Wales